Kai Helmer Helenius (born. 1931) Is a Finnish diplomat and ambassador. He is a master's degree in engineering and has served as ambassador in Jeddah and Abu Dhabi 1977–1982. Between 1983 and 1986, he was a negotiating officer of the Ministry of Foreign Affairs, 1987–1990 Under-Secretary of State for Development and again ambassador in Bonn in 1990–1996.

References 

1931 births
Ambassadors of Finland to Germany
Ambassadors of Finland to Saudi Arabia
Living people
Ambassadors of Finland to the United Arab Emirates